The 1939 Major League Baseball All-Star Game was the seventh playing of the mid-summer classic between the all-stars of the American League (AL) and National League (NL), the two leagues comprising Major League Baseball. The game was held on July 11, 1939, at Yankee Stadium in The Bronx, New York City, the home of the New York Yankees of the American League. The game resulted in the American League defeating the National League 3–1. The Yankees went on the win the World Series that year, making them the first team to host the All-Star Game and win the World Series in the same year.

Rosters
Players in italics have since been inducted into the National Baseball Hall of Fame.

National League

American League

Game

Umpires

The umpires changed assignments in the middle of the fifth inning – Hubbard and Magerkurth swapped positions, also Goetz and Rommel swapped positions.

Starting lineups

Game summary

References

External links
Baseball Almanac
Baseball-Reference

Major League Baseball All-Star Game
Major League Baseball All-Star Game
Sports in the Bronx
Major League Baseball All-Star Game
Baseball competitions in New York City
Major League Baseball All-Star Game
1930s in the Bronx